Awei (also Île Ui, Îlot Awé ) is a small uninhabited island in Malampa Province of Vanuatu in the Pacific Ocean. It is a part of the Maskelyne Islands archipelago.

Geography
Awei lies some 400 meters off the south coast of Malekula Island. The neighboring island is Vulai. The estimated terrain elevation above sea level is just 1 meter. The island area is some 40 hectares.

References

Islands of Vanuatu
Malampa Province